United States Naval Ship (USNS) is the prefix designation given to non-commissioned ships that are property of the United States Navy (USN).

Definition 

United States Naval Ships are unarmed auxiliary support vessels owned by the U.S. Navy and operated in non-commissioned service by Military Sealift Command with a civilian crew.  Some ships include a small military complement to carry out communication and special mission functions, or for force protection.

In comparison, U.S. Navy ships commissioned into service have the designation "USS" and are armed, crewed by U.S. Navy personnel, and held in property by the United States Government.  Additionally, the United States Naval Ships hull classification symbol begins with "T-" to denote its civilian crew. The USNS prefix can be assigned only while the ship is owned by the U.S. Navy. If, after being taken out of service, the ship is transferred to the Maritime Administration the prefix reverts to a civilian ship prefix such as the case of SS Comet.

See also
War Shipping Administration
United States Merchant Marine
List of Military Sealift Command ships
List of United States Navy ships
Royal Fleet Auxiliary

References

 

Ship prefixes
United States Navy